Ifeda perobtusa is a species of moth of the family Batrachedridae. It is found in Brazil, British Guiana and Peru. Its alar expense is 8-10mm.

The larvae feed on the flowers of palm species.

References

Moths described in 1922
Batrachedridae